KF Lirija Gërçar is a football club based in the village of Gërçar, Resen Municipality, North Macedonia. They are currently competing in the Macedonian Third League (Southwest Division).

References 

Lirija Gercar
Football clubs in North Macedonia